Milira is the self-titled debut studio album by American R&B singer Milira, released in 1990 on Motown Records. It reached number 29 on Billboard's Top R&B Albums chart and scored two top 40 R&B singles, "Go Outside in the Rain" and a cover version of Marvin Gaye's "Mercy Mercy Me (The Ecology)". The album also includes a cover of Aretha Franklin's "Until You Come Back to Me (That's What I'm Gonna Do)".

Track listing

Credits
Executive Producer – Harold Jackson, Noza Rivers, Oliver Sutton, Percy Sutton
Management – Donald Bowden
Mastered By – Herb Powers
Mixed By – Donald Dee Bowden, Timmy Regisford
Producer – Donald Dee Bowden
Recorded By – Elai Tubo, Gregg Mann

source:

Charts

Singles

References

External links
myspace.com-mlrmilira

1990 debut albums
Milira albums
Motown albums